Seyyed Hadi Khosroshahi (– 27 February 2020) was an Iranian cleric and diplomat who served as Iran's first ambassador to the Vatican.

Career
When he was 15 years old, Khosroshahi joined the leader of militant Fada'iyan-e Islam (Devotees of Islam), Sayyid Mojtaba Mir-Lohi, nicknamed Navvab Safavi. He was close to Egypt's Muslim Brotherhood. Based on his interviews, in at least two cases, he sought Khomeini's approval for the assassination of the Islamic Republic's first President, Abolhassan Bani Sadr and Iran's last Queen Farah Pahlavi, both living in exile in Paris. Khomeini rejected the idea, Khosroshahi maintained.

Khosroshahi was a prominent figure in the Qom Seminary and was a representative of Ayatollah Khomeini in the Ministry of Culture and Islamic Guidance after the victory of the Iranian Revolution in 1979. After two years, he became the Ambassador of the Islamic Republic to the Vatican. He was the first Shi'a clergy serving and representing the Islamic Republic at the Vatican. While in the Vatican, he founded the Europe's Islamic Culture Center, a base for propagating Shi'ism in the West. After serving in the Vatican, Khosroshahi was sent to Cairo, where he represented Tehran for two years at the Islamic Republic's Interest Section.

Death
Khosroshahi died from COVID-19 on 27 February 2020, in Iran.

See also 

 List of Ayatollahs
 List of members in the First Term of the Council of Experts

References

1930s births
2020 deaths
Iranian Shia clerics
Ambassadors of Iran to the Holy See
Islamic Republican Party politicians
Muslim People's Republic Party politicians
Deaths from the COVID-19 pandemic in Iran